MTV Roadies 7 (advertised as ROADIES) is the seventh season of MTV Roadies, a popular weekly reality television show on MTV India. The season first aired on 8 November 2009 and is airing its annual "auditions" portion in which the contestants of the show are selected.
Part of the season took place in Africa

Auditions
Auditions for the show first began approximately 2 months before the actual airing. Unlike the previous season, MTV Roadies: Hell Down Under, Raghu Ram and Rajiv Laxman are not present yet during the auditions and the journey. The auditions shown in the first episode of the season took place in the city of Kolkata in the state of West Bengal in India.

Post-Selection

After the auditions, the actual format of the show will begin. MTV Roadies is often explicit but any mature content is censored (i.e., swearing, nudity). The show involves various "tasks" which are generally mentally and physically difficult. As the show progresses, the "tasks" become harder for the contestants to achieve. At the end of each episode, the contestants will vote one contestant out of the show, however it is seen in previous seasons of the show have shown that a previous contestant may return to the show after being voted out.

List of Roadies

 Ameya R. Kadam: Ameya is 20-year-old student of Commercial Arts.
 Amritpal Singh: Amritpal is a 24-year-old guy from Mumbai. He is the adventure loving Roadie in MTV Roadies 7.
 Anwar Syed: The winner of Roadies 7, Anwar is a 24-year-old guy. He is the sports loving Roadie in Roadies 7.
 Bharti Nagpal: Bharti Nagpal is a 23-year-old girl from Delhi. She is the travel loving Roadie in MTV Roadies 7.
 Charlie Chauhan: Charlie is a 20-year-old female from Shimla. She is fun loving Roadies in Roadies 7.
 Eric Roy: Eric is a 20-year-old guy from Kolkata. He is the smart Roadies in MTV Roadies 7.
 Gaurav Gill: Gaurav is a 21-year-old guy from Mumbai. He is music loving Roadies in Roadies 7.
 Mannat Mundi: Mannat is an 18-year-old girl from Chandigarh. She was challenging rider in MTV Roadies 7.
 Meghna Mirgnani: Meghna is a 24-year-old girl from Mumbai. She is nature loving Roadies in Roadies 7.
 Mohit Malik: Mohit is a 19-year-old intelligent guy. He is also a good Roadies in MTV Roadies 7.
 Nisha Rana: Nisha Rana is a 25-year-old girl from Chandigarh. She is also challenging Roadies in Roadies 7.
 Priyanka Roy: Priyanka is a 22-year-old female from Kolkata. She is painting loving Roadies in MTV Roadies 7.
 Ravneet Kaur: Ravneet is an 18-year-old simple girl. She is basketball loving Roadies in Roadies 7.
 Vikas Ambwani: Vikas is a 24-year-old guy from Kota. He is the hardworking Roadies in MTV Roadies 7.
 Vikram Jeet Singh: Vikram is a 23-year-old guy from Delhi. He is fun loving rider in Roadies 7.
 Yatin Madhok: Yatin is a 19-year-old guy from Delhi. He is friendly rider in MTV Roadies 7.
 Zaid Bin Nazir: Zaid is a 24-year-old guy from Bangalore. He is also fun loving guy who is the Roadies in Roadies 7.
 Priyanka Telang: Priyanka is a 24-year-old girl.
 Rahul Suri: Rahul is a 25-year-old guy from Delhi.
 Ranjna Rawat: Ranjna Rawat is a 21-year-old girl from Chandigarh.
 Rishabh Gulati: Rishabh is a 20-year-old guy from Delhi.
 Sahibjit Singh: Sahibjit is a 21-year-old guy from Delhi.
 Shweta Bisen: Shweta is a 24-year-old girl from Nagpur.

MTV Hero Honda Roadies 7 have selected total 24 riders to go for RIDE WITH RANNVIJAY (a part of audition process took place in roadies 7). And the participants survived RIDE WITH RANNVIJAY went on become roadies. Roadies 7 riders have been selected by MTV Roadies team in auditions which was held in various locations of the country. Roadies 7 participants are known as the riders also.

References

MTV Roadies
2009 Indian television seasons
2010 Indian television seasons